Euzopherodes euphrontis is a species of snout moth in the genus Euzopherodes. It was described by Edward Meyrick in 1937, and is known from the Democratic Republic of the Congo.

References

Moths described in 1937
Phycitini